The 2015 Heartland Championship, the tenth edition of the Heartland Championship since the 2006 reconstruction of the National Provincial Championship, was a rugby union competition involving the twelve semi-professional rugby unions in New Zealand. The tournament involved a round-robin stage in which the twelve teams played eight games each and then the top four advanced to the Meads Cup semifinals, while fifth to eighth advanced to the Lochore Cup semifinals. In both of these knockout stages the top seeds (first and fifth) played at home against the lowest seeds (fourth and eighth), the second highest seeds (second and sixth) played at home against the third highest seeds (third and seventh) and the final had the higher seed playing at home against the lower seed.

Teams

The 2015 Heartland Championship was contested by the following teams.

Standings

In the case of a two-team tie on points the ranking of teams is decided by:
 (1) the winner of the round robin match between the two provinces; then 
 (2) highest point difference; then 
 (3) most tries scored; then 
 (4) a coin toss.
In the caseof a three-team or more tie on points the ranking of teams is decided by:
 (1) the province with the most wins against other tied provinces in the Round Robin; then 
 (2) if two teams remain tied they shall be ranked according to the criteria listed above, but if more than two teams remain tied, they shall be ranked according to criteria (2) to (4) only.

Finals

Semifinals
Meads Cup

Lochore Cup

Finals
Meads Cup

Lochore Cup

Heartland Championship
Heartland
Heartland